The 2016–17 World Rugby Women's Sevens Series was the fifth edition of the World Rugby Women's Sevens Series (formerly the IRB Women's Sevens World Series), an annual series of tournaments organised by World Rugby for women's national teams in rugby sevens.

The competition
There were six tournament events in 2016–17. Twelve teams competed at each event; eleven being "core" teams, with a twelfth team invited to participate in particular events (similar to previous women's series as well as the men's counterpart). At each event teams compete for gold, silver and bronze medals with the third place match now renamed as the Bronze match while lower ranked teams will contest a new Challenge Trophy competition. The overall winner of the series was determined by points gained from the standings across all events in the season.

Teams
Eleven "core teams" qualified to participate in all series events for the 2016–17 series, the same number as the previous season. The top nine finishers in the previous series were granted core team status:

 
 
 
 
 

 
 
 
 

Two additional core teams qualified for the 2016–17 series:
  – ninth place (highest finisher not already qualified) at the 2016 Olympic Games
  – third place (highest finisher not already qualified) at the 2016 Olympic Qualification Tournament

The twelfth team at each tournament in the 2016–17 series was invited at the discretion of World Rugby.

Events

Standings
Final standings for the 2016–17 series:

Source: World Rugby (archived)

{| class="wikitable" style="font-size:92%;"
|-
!colspan=2| Legend
|- style="line-height:18px; font-size:90%;"
|colspan=2 align=center |Qualification for 2017–18 World Sevens Series
|-
|bgcolor=ccffcc|Green
|Qualified as a core team for Series VI
|-
|No colour
|The remainder do not directly qualify for Series VI
|- style="line-height:18px; font-size:90%;"
|colspan=2 align=center |Qualification for 2018 Rugby World Cup Sevens
|-
|colspan=2 style="border-left:3px solid #06F;"| Already confirmed for 2018 (host country United States and 2013 semifinalists)
|-
|colspan=2 style="border-left:3px solid #7CF;"| Qualified as one of the four highest placed teams from  Series V that have not already qualified. 
|}

Tournaments

Dubai

In the first event of the series, New Zealand took revenge for their Olympic final loss by defeating Australia in the Cup final. The three medalists from the Olympic Games were unbeaten in the pool stage of the competition. In the quarter finals stage, Russia put behind their failure to qualify for the Olympics earlier in the year by eliminating Rio bronze medalists Canada. The final was a repeat of the Olympic final with Australia battling throughout the final but tries to Portia Woodman and Rebekah Cordero-Tufuga gave New Zealand the gold medal. The 5th place final was won by Fiji, while Ireland won the first Challenge Trophy which replaced the Bowl competition.

Sydney

Australia was included on the women's world circuit for the first time at the 2017 Sydney Women's Sevens. On the opening day of competition, England was the only core team not to make the Cup quarterfinals with only a win against Spain from their three pool matches. The upset of the tournament came from the United States as they defeated New Zealand in the semifinal stage. Canada won the Cup final over their North American neighbours, however, by 21–17. Fiji won the 5th place final for the second time in a row and Brazil won the Challenge Trophy.

Las Vegas

After a month break, the tour headed to the United States for the first USA Women's Sevens tournament to be held in Las Vegas. On the opening day of competition, Canada and New Zealand each recorded a three from three in the pool stage. Also during the day Ghislaine Landry converting Moleschi's try got her level with Portia Woodman as the all-time leading point scorer in the series with 665. New Zealand took the Cup on the second day, defeating Australia 28-5 and didn't look troubled throughout the final match. In the bronze medal match, Canada maintained their edge over the hosts winning by 31–7. in the minor play-offs, Fiji won the 5th place final again while Spain took the Challenge Trophy.

Kitakyushu

The series headed off to Japan for the first ever Japan Women's Sevens. The opening day would see the top three at the time in New Zealand, Australia and Canada winning all three of their matches in the group stage. The second day would see the top three qualify through to the cup semi-finals with Fiji being the fourth team as they made it through to the Cup Semi-Finals for the first time since 2014. But New Zealand would take the Cup title for the third tournament of the season as they defeated Canada in the final in a cup final meeting for the first time since Atlanta 2014. Russia would finish in fifth place while Ireland took out the Challenge after defeating Spain.

Langford

Clermont-Ferrand

Placings summary
Tallies of top four tournament placings during the 2016–17 series, by team (updated to Canada):

See also

 2016–17 World Rugby Sevens Series (for men)
 2017 Hong Kong Women's Sevens

References

 
2016
2016 rugby sevens competitions
2017 rugby sevens competitions
2016 in women's rugby union
2017 in women's rugby union